The Heart of a Coward is a 1926 silent adventure film directed by Duke Worne and starring Billy Sullivan.

Cast
Billy Sullivan 
Charlotte Stevens
Edith Yorke
Jack Richardson
Miles McCarthy
Betty Baker

Preservation status
The film and its trailer survive in the Library of Congress collection.

References

External links

1926 films
American silent feature films
Films directed by Duke Worne
American black-and-white films
Rayart Pictures films
American adventure films
1926 adventure films
1920s American films
Silent adventure films